Mo Jamil Adeniran (born 25 September 1995) is an English singer. He rose to fame after winning the sixth series of The Voice UK, where he won a recording contract with Polydor Records. His debut album, titled Evolve, charted at number 36 on the UK Album Charts.

Early life
Before auditioning for The Voice UK, Jamil was a hotel worker. He is from Warrington and is of Yoruba descent.

Career

2017: The Voice UK
Adeniran auditioned for The Voice UK, and joined Jennifer Hudson's team, after receiving a turn from each coach. He won his battle round against Diamond, and later went through to the live shows. He was automatically safe in the first two live shows, and was announced as the winner in the grand final on 2 April 2017.

Performances

2018–present: Evolve 
On 30 March 2018 Jamil released his debut studio album, Evolve. The album peaked at 36 on the UK Albums Chart. Following this, Jamil was dropped from Polydor Records.

Discography

Studio albums

Extended plays

Singles

References

21st-century Black British male singers
English pop singers
English soul singers
Musicians from Cheshire
1996 births
Living people
The Voice (franchise) winners
The Voice UK contestants
English people of Yoruba descent
English people of Nigerian descent
Yoruba musicians